The name Nadine has been used for twelve tropical cyclones worldwide; three in the Atlantic Ocean and nine in the Western Pacific Ocean.

In the Atlantic Ocean:
Tropical Storm Nadine (2000), did not threaten land.
Hurricane Nadine (2012), long-lived hurricane that churned in the open ocean.
Tropical Storm Nadine (2018), never affected land. 

In the Western Pacific Ocean:
Typhoon Nadine (1948) (T4804)
Typhoon Nadine (1956) (T5621)
Tropical Storm Nadine (1960) (T6004)
Tropical Storm Nadine (1962) (T6237)
Tropical Storm Nadine (1965) (T6519, 22W)
Tropical Storm Nadine (1968) (T6805, 08W, Didang)
Typhoon Nadine (1971) (T7118, Sisang)
Tropical Storm Nadine (1974) (T7417, Norming)
Tropical Storm Nadine (1978) (T7801)

Atlantic hurricane set index articles
Pacific typhoon set index articles